Emmanuel Nii Tettey Oku (born 13 October 1990) is a Ghanaian  Paralympic athlete and  para powerlifter. He represented Ghana and competed in the men's 72 kg event at the 2020 Summer Paralympics in Tokyo.

See also 
 Ghana at the 2020 Summer Paralympics

References

External links 
 Emmanuel Nii Tettey Oku at 2020 Tokyo Paralympics

Living people
1990 births
Powerlifters at the 2020 Summer Paralympics
Ghanaian people with disabilities
Ghanaian disabled sportspeople
Paralympic powerlifters of Ghana
Powerlifters at the 2022 Commonwealth Games
Commonwealth Games competitors for Ghana